The Illinois Mathematics and Science Academy, or IMSA, is a three-year residential public secondary education institution in Aurora, Illinois, United States, with an enrollment of approximately 650 students.

Enrollment is generally offered to incoming sophomores, although younger students who have had the equivalent of one year of algebra and a 9th-grade science equivalent are eligible to apply. All applicants undergo a competitive admissions process involving the review of grades, teacher evaluations, student essays, and SAT scores. Historically, approximately one-third of applicants in any given year are admitted. Due to its nature as a public institution, there are no charges related to tuition, room, and board; however, there is an annual student fee that may be reduced or waived based on family income. IMSA has been consistently ranked by Newsweek as one of the top ten high schools in the country for math and science, and some of its graduates have become leaders in a variety of fields. It is the top-rated public high school in Illinois on Niche.com.

History
The school's founding president was former Batavia Superintendent Stephanie Pace Marshall, who was involved with the project from the start and helped write IMSA's original legislation. Marshall retired from the position on June 30, 2007, and was later named President Emerita by the Board of Trustees.

Although the school received a budget cut in financial year 2002, its budget has since increased with the support of House Minority Leader Tom Cross. IMSA's chairperson was Paula Olszewski-Kubilius.

Admission

Prospective students, who are usually freshmen in high school but in some cases may be eighth graders, must complete an application to be considered for admission to IMSA.

The application process consists of an official transcript of the student's last 2½ years of school, scores from the SAT I, four student essays, three teacher evaluations in science, mathematics, and English, and a list of awards and extracurricular activities.

Historic admission statistics

In order to draw greater numbers of applications and "transform teaching and learning," IMSA has an outreach program run by the Center for Teaching and Learning (formerly known as The Center for Advancement and Renewal of Learning and Teaching (The Center@IMSA), then "Professional Field Services (PFS)"). Some students who are invited to attend IMSA are admitted on the condition that they successfully complete a three-week, intensive preparation course, known as EXCEL, over the summer. IMSA has a fairly low retention rate; the average retention rate per class is 85%. The reasons for this may include the difficulty of the IMSA curriculum, home-sickness, disciplinary expulsion, student's family moving out of state, and the inability for Illinois students to matriculate to IMSA after their sophomore year.

Academics
Students at IMSA take rigorous college preparatory courses, with all classes being taught at the honors level, though IMSA philosophically spurns the Advanced Placement curriculum. Each student must fulfill a set of specific credits in order to graduate. This set of credits is broken down by academic subject. Each semester-long class counts for 0.5 credits, unless it meets with greater-than-normal frequency.

In addition to the academic program, IMSA also offers a large number clubs ranging from religious clubs to volunteer organizations. All these clubs are chartered by the Student Council, colloquially referred to as StudCo.

Student Inquiry and Research

Most Wednesdays are "I Days" (for "inquiry") and are usually reserved for juniors and seniors to research in the SIR program. SIR also runs during the summer of one's sophomore year and junior year, allowing a student to conduct four disparate investigations.

External programs
Unlike many other secondary schools, IMSA runs extracurricular and summer programs for the teachers and students of the State of Illinois. The Center for Teaching and Learning (CTL), is the division of the academy that directs and manages programs serving Illinois Educators and Students. CTL offerings enable students to develop and sustain Science, Technology, Engineering and Mathematics (STEM) skills. CTL Student offerings include the IMSA Fusion program, Summer@IMSA, Funshop student enrichment programs, an on-line research course (RISE) open to all Illinois students, ALLIES (selected High School students that lead and facilitate inquiry-based STEM programs) and a variety of online learning experiences. CTL Educator offerings include professional development to include IMSA Core Competencies, IMSA Fusion (Offering professional development for educators teaching the FUSION after school program) and the annual "IMSA Teacher Institute Day" for local Mathematics and Science educators.
All CTL Programs place a special emphasis on students who are historically under-represented and under-served in math and science. Uniquely, The Center for Teaching and Learning, also operates a field office in the Metro-east area.

Student life

Publications
The Acronym is IMSA's student-run general affairs newspaper. In the 2008–2009 school year The Acronym ceased paper publishing and transitioned to an online format. The Acronym also publishes yearly Back to School editions and Senior editions at the beginning and end of the school year, respectively. Hadron is IMSA's student-run math and science magazine, a periodical which focuses on science and its application to current events and popular culture.

Athletics
IMSA is a member of the Illinois High School Association (IHSA), the organization which governs most sports and competitive activities in the state of Illinois, and began competing in the Northeastern Athletic Conference (NAC), a subdivision of the IHSA, during the 2009–2010 school year. IMSA's sports teams are stylized as the Titans.

The school sponsors interscholastic teams for young men and women in basketball, cross country, golf, soccer, swimming & diving, tennis, track & field, and volleyball.  Young men may compete in baseball, while young women may compete in bowling, cheerleading, and softball.  While not sponsored by the IHSA, the school also sponsors a dance team for young men and women.

Competitive activities
The following teams have finished in the top four of their respective IHSA sponsored state championship tournament:
 Chess:  4th place (1997–98, 1998–99, 2009–1); 3rd place (1990–91, 1994–95, 2003–04, 2004–05, 2015–16); 2nd place (1989–90); State Champions (1986–87, 1987–88, 1995–96, 1996–97, 2016–17, 2017–18)
 Scholastic Bowl: 4th place (1991–92, 2014–15); 3rd place (2009–10, 2015–16, 2017–18, 2018–19); 2nd place (1992–93); State Champions (1988–89, 1989–90, 1993–94, 1995–96, 1996–97, 1997–98, 1998–99, 2000–01, 2010–11, 2011–12, 2013–14, 2016–17, 2021-2022)

Student Leadership and Development (SLD) Programs

Student Council
In addition to its primary role as the mediator between administrators and students, Student Council works with administrators to change aspects of the Academy. The Student Council website provides the student body relevant information about projects that the council is working on. Student Council also charters clubs at the beginning of each academic year and provides them with the necessary funds to hold various events. Student Council works throughout the year to collect student feedback and use that information to make changes that reflect the intentions of the student body.

Awards
IMSA consistently ranks at the top of the nation in standardized test scores (of roughly 200 students in the senior class, about 50 are National Merit Semifinalists), as well as in the prestigious Siemens and Intel Science competitions. In the class of 2009, five students were named Siemens Regional Finalists and ten others as semifinalists.

Six mathematics teachers have been honored with the Edyth May Sliffe Award: Titu Andreescu (1994), Ronald Vavrinek (1995), Micah Fogel (2001), Steven Condie (2002), Michael Keyton (2003), Don Porzio (2004), and Steven Condie (2nd award) (2007).  Asteroid 21441 Stevencondie is named after Dr. Condie.

Notable alumni
Ramez Naam (1990) - software developer and author.  He helped develop Microsoft's Internet Explorer and Outlook.
Steven Johnson (1991) - Professor of Applied Mathematics and Physics at MIT.
Scott Gaudi (1991) - Exoplanet hunter and Professor of Astronomy at Ohio State University.
Yu Pan (1995) - one of the six co-creators of PayPal and was the first employee at YouTube.
Sam Yagan (1995) - one of the co-founders of SparkNotes and has also co-founded OkCupid, one of the largest (free) web-based online dating sites in the world.
Steve Chen (Technically an alumni since he attended IMSA, but left before he graduated)(1996) - co-founder/Chief Technology Officer of YouTube, and an early engineer at  PayPal.
Clara Shih (2000) - bestselling author of The Facebook Era, co-founder of Hearsay Social, and member of Starbucks' Board of Directors.
Sabrina Gonzalez Pasterski (2010) - prominent theoretical physicist who studies high energy physics at Harvard University.

See also
 University Laboratory High School
 Alabama School of Mathematics and Science
 Arkansas School for Mathematics, Sciences, and the Arts
 Carol Martin Gatton Academy of Mathematics and Science in Kentucky
 Craft Academy for Excellence in Science and Mathematics
 Indiana Academy for Science, Mathematics, and Humanities
 Kansas Academy of Mathematics and Science
 Louisiana School for Math, Science, and the Arts
 Maine School of Science and Mathematics 
 Mississippi School for Mathematics and Science
 North Carolina School of Science and Mathematics
 Oklahoma School of Science and Mathematics
 South Carolina Governor's School for Science and Mathematics
 Texas Academy of Mathematics and Science

External links

 IMSA's website
 School newspaper The Acronym

References

Gifted education
Public high schools in Illinois
NCSSS schools
Magnet schools in Illinois
Educational institutions established in 1985
Education in Aurora, Illinois
Schools in Kane County, Illinois
1985 establishments in Illinois
Public boarding schools in the United States
Boarding schools in Illinois